Udea liopis is a moth of the family Crambidae. It is endemic to the Hawaiian islands of Maui, Hawaii, Kauai, Oahu, Molokai and Lanai.

Subspecies
Udea liopis liopis (Maui, Hawaii)
Udea liopis rhodias Meyrick, 1899 (Kauai, Oahu, Molokai, Lanai)

External links

Moths described in 1899
Endemic moths of Hawaii
liopis